"Surma Kaala" is a Punjabi single by Jassie Gill featuring Rhea Chakraborty. Composed and lyrics are by Jass Manak, released on 11 April 2019 by T-Series.

Music Video 
Video of the song was published by T-Series on 12 April 2019 on YouTube. The music video alongside Jassi Gill features Rhea Chakraborty - The Maagi and it has well received over 80 million  views Jassi Gill.

Reception 
The song is well praised and received by audience.

References 

2019 singles
T-Series (company) singles
Punjabi-language songs